Jeferson Fernandes Macedo (born 17 July 1991), known as Perdigão,  is a Brazilian footballer who plays as a winger for Cuiabá.

Career
Born in São Miguel do Iguaçu, Perdigão started competing in Cianorte, from where he moved to Portugal in 2011; joining Tourizense in Portuguese third tier.

His performances led him to a move to S.C. Braga, signing on 30 January 2013, and briefly competing for their reserve squad, debuting on 3 February 2013, in a Segunda Liga match against Tondela.

He was released six months later, and returned to the third tier, signing with Famalicão, adding nearly thirty league caps in the sole season there. In May 2014, Perdigão moved to Desportivo Aves, returning to the Segunda Liga, debuting for his new team on 27 July 2014.
After one and half seasons with Aves, he moved to Chaves and signed a six-month deal. In May 2016, he extended his contract with Chaves for another two seasons.

On 29 July 2020, FC Alashkert announced the signing of Perdigão.

References

External links

1991 births
Living people
Sportspeople from Paraná (state)
Brazilian footballers
Association football forwards
Brazilian expatriate footballers
Primeira Liga players
Liga Portugal 2 players
Armenian Premier League players
G.D. Tourizense players
S.C. Braga players
F.C. Famalicão players
C.D. Aves players
G.D. Chaves players
Boavista F.C. players
FC Alashkert players
Cuiabá Esporte Clube players
Expatriate footballers in Portugal
Expatriate footballers in Armenia
Brazilian expatriate sportspeople in Portugal
Brazilian expatriate sportspeople in Armenia